Ben Franklin Academy (BFA) is a private senior high school in unincorporated DeKalb County, Georgia, United States, in Greater Atlanta. It follows a "mastery" curriculum, and serves students in grades 9-12. The school is located at 1585 Clifton Road NE, 30329, with an Atlanta postal address.

Gallery

References

External links
 Ben Franklin Academy

Educational institutions established in 1987
Private high schools in DeKalb County, Georgia
1987 establishments in Georgia (U.S. state)